Sebastian Roloff (born 28 January 1983) is a German lawyer and politician of the Social Democratic Party (SPD) who has been serving as a member of the Bundestag since October 2021, representing the constituency of Munich south.

Early life and career
Roloff was born 1983 in Berlin, but grew up in Eastern Bavaria (Rettenbach/Landkreis Cham). After visiting the Joseph von Fraunhofer Gymnasium Cham, he served in the local hospital of Wörth an der Donau and then studied law at the University of Regensburg. After working as a lawyer with trade union IG Metall in Munich from 2011 to 2019, Roloff held various positions in human resources at MAN Truck & Bus from 2019 to 2021 (the last being Senior Vice President Human Resources) before his election to the Bundestag.

Political career
Roloff joined the SPD in 1999. He held several positions on the local level as well as being deputy federal chairman of the social democratic youth organization Jusos from 2011 until 2013. While studying, he was active in the students' union, being the chair of the students' parliament at the University of Regensburg from 2005 until 2008. In 2017 he ran for parliament in the constituency of Munich south for the first time and was elected to the Bundestag in the 2021 elections. 

In parliament, Roloff has since been serving on the Committee on Economic Affairs. In this capacity, he is his parliamentary group’s rapporteur on self-employment and postal services, for the air and space industry, materials, the building industry, reduction of bureaucracy, competition law, transformation of the car industry and principles of economical policy. He is a deputy member of the Committee on Legal Affairs and a deputy member of the Committee for the Scrutiny of Elections, Immunity, and the Rules of Procedure.

Within his parliamentary group, Roloff belongs to the Parliamentary Left, a left-wing movement. In September 2021 he was elected co-chair of the left wing of the social democratic party Forum DL 21.

Other activities

Corporate boards
 Knorr-Bremse, Member of the Supervisory Board (2014–2019)

Non-profit organizations
 Georg von Vollmar Academy, Member of the Board of Trustees (since 2020)
 Union of Persecutees of the Nazi Regime, Member
 IG Metall, Member
In 2013 Roloff has been appointed as an honorary judge to the Labour Law Court Munich. Since 2018 he serves as an honorary judge at the State Labour Court of Munich.

References

External links 
  
 Bundestag biography 

Social Democratic Party of Germany politicians
Members of the Bundestag for Bavaria
Members of the Bundestag 2021–2025
21st-century German politicians
Living people
1983 births
People from Berlin
Members of the Bundestag for the Social Democratic Party of Germany